Mitchell Bradley Clarke (born November 24, 1985) is a Canadian professional wrestler and former mixed martial artist. He fought as a Lightweight for the Ultimate Fighting Championship, and is the head coach at Complete Fitness & Martial Arts, St. Albert, Canada. He currently wrestles for the Edmonton based promotions Real Canadian Wrestling and Love Wrestling.

Background
Clarke was born and raised in Saskatoon, Saskatchewan. He competed in wrestling at Walter Murray Collegiate Institute. He attended the University of Saskatchewan from where he graduated with a degree in environmental science.

Mixed martial arts career

Early career
Clarke made his professional MMA debut in May 2007.  He fought exclusively in Canada and amassed a record of 9–0 before signing with the Ultimate Fighting Championship.

Ultimate Fighting Championship
Clarke made his UFC debut at UFC 140 in Toronto, Ontario against promotional newcomer John Cholish. He lost the fight via TKO (punches) at 4:36 of the second round resulting in the first loss of his professional career.

Clarke faced Anton Kuivanen on July 21, 2012 at UFC 149. He lost the fight via split decision.

Clarke faced John Maguire on June 15, 2013 at UFC 161. He won the fight via unanimous decision.

Clarke faced Al Iaquinta at UFC 173, in his first match outside of Canada. After being dominated in the first round, Clarke won the fight via submission due to a D'Arce choke from the bottom in the second round.  The win earned Clarke his first Performance of the Night bonus award.

Clarke faced Michael Chiesa on April 4, 2015 at UFC Fight Night 63. He lost the fight by unanimous decision.

Clarke next faced Joseph Duffy on July 7, 2016 at UFC Fight Night 90. He lost the fight via submission in the opening minute of the first round.

Clarke faced Alex White on September 9, 2017 at UFC 215. He lost the fight via TKO at 4:36 of the second round and subsequently announced his retirement from mixed martial arts. He voiced his appreciation to Edmonton fans at the after fight octagon interview with Joe Rogan and delivered his emotional and humble retirement speech:

Personal life
He currently resides in Edmonton, Alberta, and trains at Complete Fitness and Martial Arts in St Albert. He has won the Welterweight title with the EFC out of Lloydminster and also won the Lightweight title for the TFC.  He also trains in Arizona at the MMA Lab with John Crouch and Benson Henderson. Clarke is the son of Rick Clarke & Elise Brust and stepson of Vickie Clarke. After UFC 173, Clarke told reporters his favourite Super NES video game is Turtles in Time.

Championships and achievements

Mixed martial arts
Evolution Fighting Championships
EFC Lightweight Championship (One time)
The Fight Club
TFC Lightweight Championship (One time)
Ultimate Fighting Championship
Performance of the Night (One time) vs. Al Iaquinta

Professional Wrestling
Monster Pro Wrestling
MPW Heavyweight Championship (One time, current)
MPW Renegade Tag Team Championships (Two times)

Mixed martial arts record

|-
|Loss
|align=center|11–5
|Alex White
|TKO (punches)
|UFC 215 
|
|align=center|2
|align=center|4:36
|Edmonton, Alberta, Canada
|
|-
|Loss
|align=center|11–4
|Joseph Duffy
|Submission (rear-naked choke)
|UFC Fight Night: dos Anjos vs. Alvarez
|
|align=center|1
|align=center|0:25
|Las Vegas, Nevada, United States
|  
|-
|Loss
|align=center|11–3
|Michael Chiesa
|Decision (unanimous)
|UFC Fight Night: Mendes vs. Lamas
|
|align=center|3
|align=center|5:00
|Fairfax, Virginia, United States
|
|-
|Win
|align=center|11–2
|Al Iaquinta
|Technical Submission (D'Arce choke)
|UFC 173
|
|align=center| 2
|align=center| 0:57
|Las Vegas, Nevada, United States
|
|-
|Win
|align=center|10–2
|John Maguire
|Decision (unanimous)
|UFC 161
|
|align=center|3
|align=center|5:00
|Winnipeg, Manitoba, Canada
|
|-
|Loss
|align=center|9–2
|Anton Kuivanen
|Decision (split)
|UFC 149
|
|align=center|3
|align=center|5:00
|Calgary, Alberta, Canada
|
|-
|Loss
|align=center|9–1
|John Cholish
|TKO (punches)
|UFC 140
|
|align=center|2
|align=center|4:36
|Toronto, Ontario, Canada
|
|-
|Win
|align=center|9–0
|Eddie Rincon
|Decision (unanimous)
|EFC 8: Aggression
|
|align=center|3
|align=center|5:00
|Lloydminster, Alberta, Canada
|
|-
|Win
|align=center|8–0
|Josh Machan
|Submission (rear-naked choke)
|The Fight Club 11
|
|align=center|2
|align=center|0:43
|Edmonton, Alberta, Canada
|
|-
|Win
|align=center|7–0
|Brandon MacArthur
|Submission (rear-naked choke)
|The Fight Club 10
|
|align=center|2
|align=center|1:14
|Edmonton, Alberta, Canada
|
|-
|Win
|align=center|6–0
|Travis Briere
|Decision (unanimous)
|Adrenaline 1
|
|align=center|3
|align=center|3:00
|Edmonton, Alberta, Canada
|
|-
|Win
|align=center|5–0
|Adam Hunsperger
|Submission (guillotine choke)
|The Fight Club 7: Full Throttle
|
|align=center|1
|align=center|0:56
|Edmonton, Alberta, Canada
|
|-
|Win
|align=center|4–0
|Paul Grandbois
|Submission (armbar)
|EFC 2: Redemption
|
|align=center|2
|align=center|2:41
|Lloydminster, Alberta, Canada
|
|-
|Win
|align=center|3–0
|Darren Ford
|Submission (guillotine choke)
|EFC 1: First Conflict
|
|align=center|1
|align=center|N/A
|Lloydminster, Alberta, Canada
|
|-
|Win
|align=center|2–0
|Jase Nibourg
|TKO (punches)
|KOTC: Brawl in the Mall 2
|
|align=center|1
|align=center|3:41
|Edmonton, Alberta, Canada
|
|-
|Win
|align=center|1–0
|Jase Nibourg
|Submission (choke) 
|XCW: Extreme Cage Warz
|
|align=center|N/A
|align=center|N/A
|Saskatoon, Saskatchewan, Canada
|
|-

See also
 List of current UFC fighters
 List of male mixed martial artists
 List of Canadian UFC fighters

References

External links
 
 

1985 births
Living people
Canadian male mixed martial artists
Lightweight mixed martial artists
Mixed martial artists utilizing wrestling
Mixed martial artists utilizing Brazilian jiu-jitsu
Sportspeople from Edmonton
Sportspeople from Saskatoon
Ultimate Fighting Championship male fighters
Canadian practitioners of Brazilian jiu-jitsu
People awarded a black belt in Brazilian jiu-jitsu